Distichochlamys benenica is a species of flowering plant in the ginger family. It was first described by Q.B.Nguyen and Škorničk.

Range
Distichochlamys benenica is native to northern Vietnam.

References

Zingiberoideae